Podocarpus subtropicalis is a species of conifer in the family Podocarpaceae. It is found only in China.

References

subtropicalis
Data deficient plants
Taxonomy articles created by Polbot
Plants described in 1985
Taxa named by David John de Laubenfels